Skyscanner is a metasearch engine and travel agency based in Edinburgh, Scotland. The site is available in over 30 languages and is used by 100 million people per month. The company lets people research and book travel options for their trips, including flights, hotels and car hire.

History
The company was formed in 2003 by three information technology professionals, Gareth Williams, Barry Smith, and Bonamy Grimes, after Gareth was frustrated by the difficulties of finding cheap flights to ski resorts. Skyscanner was first developed and released in 2002. In 2003, the first employee was hired to assist with site development. The Edinburgh office was opened in 2004.

In 2008, Skyscanner received first round funding of £2.5 million from venture capital firm Scottish Equity Partners (SEP).

In 2009, the year after SEP invested in the business, Skyscanner reported its first profit.

In 2011, Skyscanner acquired Zoombu. Skyscanner opened an office in Singapore in September 2011, which is headquarters for its Asia-Pacific operations. In 2012, a Beijing office was added, as Skyscanner began a partnership with Baidu, China's largest search engine.

By 2013, the company employed over 180 people. In February 2013, Skyscanner announced plans to open a United States base in Miami. In October 2013, Sequoia Capital purchased an interest in Skyscanner that valued the company at $800 million. In June 2014, Skyscanner acquired Youbibi, a travel search engine company based in Shenzhen, China.

In October 2014, Skyscanner acquired the Budapest-based mobile app developer Distinction.

By February 2015, the company employed 600 people, double the employment of 18 months earlier.

In January 2016, the company raised $192 million based on a $1.6 billion valuation for the company.

In November 2016, a Chinese company Trip.com Group (formerly Ctrip) bought Skyscanner for $1.75 billion. Following the sale to Ctrip, Skyscanner’s largest shareholder, SEP, completed its exit from the business.

In 2017, Ctrip bought the Trip.com domain and launched Trip.com. The original platform became a subsidiary of Skyscanner.

In 2020, the company announced that they would be laying off 300 employees after COVID-19 rocked the travel industry. This represented 20 per cent of their staff with two offices in Budapest, Hungary and Sofia, Bulgaria, likely to shut down.

In 2022, Huawei and Skyscanner forms a partnership to bring various travel services Huawei Mobile Services (HMS) and Petal Search and Petal Maps.

References

External links
 

Trip.com Group
Metasearch engines
Travel ticket search engines
Universal Windows Platform apps
British travel websites
British companies established in 2002
Transport companies established in 2002
Internet properties established in 2002
2016 mergers and acquisitions
British subsidiaries of foreign companies
Companies based in Edinburgh
2002 establishments in Scotland